Kitolov shells are Russian laser-guided mortar and artillery shells with Malakhit automated artillery fire control system able to attack stationary and moving targets with top attack pattern.
The 120mm mortar round is called Kitolov-2 and the 122mm artillery shell Kitolov-2M.
Several mortars using this system can fire simultaneously without interfering with each other, and the system is using common data for targets spaced at up to 300 m.

Users

See also
Krasnopol (weapon system)
KM-8 Gran

References

Weapons of Russia
KBP Instrument Design Bureau products
Artillery shells